Robert Matthewson (13 April 1930 – 10 November 2000) was an English footballer and FIFA referee. Born in Newcastle upon Tyne, Matthewson had a spell playing for the Byker Youth Club's football team before he was signed by Bolton Wanderers. After six appearances for Bolton in six seasons, including three appearances in the Football League, Matthewson was allowed to leave the club on a free transfer by manager Bill Ridding. He then joined Lincoln City but never played a league game for them. He then entered National Service. Upon his return an engineering colleague persuaded him to take up refereeing back in Bolton in 1958–1959, progressing through local leagues to the Lancashire Combination and Northern Premier League.

Matthewson became a Football League linesman in 1966 and two years later joined the list of referees. He made a quick impression and was senior linesman for the 1970 FA Cup Final between Chelsea and Leeds. A year later he took charge of a League Cup semi-final between Stoke City and West Ham United and in late 1972 was promoted to the FIFA List of referees. He was in charge of the remarkable 1974 FA Charity Shield match. This was Brian Clough's first major match as manager of Leeds but became better-known for a double sending-off. Matthewson sent Leeds United's Billy Bremner and Liverpool's Kevin Keegan off for fighting, the first time players had been dismissed in a major British club match at Wembley. The following year he was referee for the FA Cup semi-final at Hillsborough between Birmingham City and Fulham. His career in England culminated with Manchester United's 2–1 win over Liverpool in the 1977 FA Cup Final, the result ending Liverpool's hopes of the domestic League and Cup double. In May 1977 he signed on to become an official in the North American Soccer League.

On the international stage he only officiated two full international matches: the first was a UEFA Euro 1976 qualifying Group 8 match between Malta and Greece on 23 February 1975 and the second was a friendly between Wales and West Germany on 6 October 1976. He also refereed the 1974–75 UEFA Cup semi-final first leg between Köln and Borussia Mönchengladbach on 8 April 1975.

With his wife, Pauline, Matthewson had a daughter Karen, a step-daughter Suzanne and three grandchildren. As well as playing and refereeing football, Matthewson also worked as an engineer for de Havilland in Horwich. Matthewson was portrayed in the 2009 film The Damned United by Peter Quinn, the secretary of Blackburn non-league football club Sporting Athletic.

References

Print
Football League Handbooks, 1966-1977
Hugman, Barry J (1984) Football Players' Records 1946–1984, Newnes, p322 - confirmation of birth date and playing career

Internet

2000 deaths
Footballers from Newcastle upon Tyne
English footballers
Association football midfielders
Bolton Wanderers F.C. players
Lincoln City F.C. players
English football referees
1930 births